Sitespor is a Turkish sports club based in Ankara, mainly concentrated on football.

Sitespor is currently playing in the Amatör Futbol Ligleri.

Kits
The club plays in orange and black kits.

Stadium
Currently the team plays at the 15000 capacity Cebeci İnönü Stadium.

League participations
TFF Second League: 1981–1985
TFF Third League:1970–1974, 1985–1990

References

External links
Wikipedia.tr

Football clubs in Turkey